Ali Mohammed Zayd is a Yemeni ambassador, writer and translator, currently living in Paris. He was delegate of Yemen to UNESCO from 1990–2000 and has published three novels, two historical works and translated works into Arabic from French and English.  The author's work has been published in Banipal magazine.

References

Living people
Yemeni writers
Yemeni novelists
Permanent Delegates of Yemen to UNESCO
Yemeni expatriates in France
Yemeni translators
20th-century Yemeni writers
21st-century Yemeni writers
Year of birth missing (living people)